DWFX (89.9 FM), broadcasting as Fox 89.9, is a radio station owned and operated by Radio Sorsogon Network. Its studios are located at the Ground Floor, Amity Bldg. Cruzada, Washington Drive, Legazpi, Albay, and its transmitter is located at Sto. Niño Village, Brgy. Taysan, Legazpi, Albay.

References

Radio stations in Legazpi, Albay
DWFX